Big Conestoga Bridge may refer to:

Bridges over the Conestoga River in Pennsylvania:
 Bitzer's Mill Covered Bridge (Big Conestoga No. 2 Bridge)
 Pinetown Bushong's Mill Covered Bridge (Big Conestoga No. 6 Bridge)
 Bridge in West Earl Township (Big Conestoga No. 12 Bridge)